{{Infobox person
|name           = Nina Kaptsova
|image          = R&J.jpg
|imagesize      = 300px
|caption        = Nina Kaptsova and Artem Ovcharenko performing Romeo and Juliet in Bolshoi Theatre
|birth_name     = Nina Aleksandrovna Kaptsova
|birth_date     = 
|birth_place    = Rostov-on-Don, Russian SFSR, Soviet Union (now Russia)
|occupation     = Ballet dancer
|employer       = Bolshoi Theatre
}}

Nina Aleksandrovna Kaptsova (born 16 October 1978) is a Russian prima ballerina of the Bolshoi Ballet.

Biography
Kaptsova was born on 16 October 1978 in Rostov-on-Don, Russia. She was trained at the Moscow Choreographic Academy under the direction of Sofia Golovkina. After her graduation, she became a member of the Bolshoi Ballet. Her coach at Bolshoi was Marina Kondratieva, now Nina Semizorova.

Her first appearance was in the role of a cupid in Don Quixote in 1997 and the same year played a "fairy of playfulness" in The Sleeping Beauty, which was produced by Yuri Grigorovich.

In 1998, she played Sleeping Beauty again, this time as a maid of honour, and the same year played Gumpe in La Bayadère, also produced by Yuri Grigorovich. In 1999, she appeared as Marie in The Nutcracker, which was again produced by Grigorovich, and the same year performed in Swan Lake. In 2000 and 2004, she reprised her role in Sleeping Beauty, first as the Princess Aurora and then as the Prince's friend. In the same year, she had a few solo roles including that in Mozartiana and The Limpid Stream, in which she played the role of Zina.

In 2006, she appeared as Shirin in The Legend of Love (Легенда о любви) and the same year played the role of Rita in The Golden Age. In 2007, she performed in The Lesson, and in 2008 appeared in Herman Levenskiold's La Sylphide, Pyotr Tchaikovsky's The Nutcracker, and in Flames of Paris, in which she played the role of Adeline. In 2009, she performed in such plays as The Queen of Spades, in which she portrayed Liza and played the title role in Esmeralda.

Awards
The International "New Names" project Laureate
Benois de la Dance – 2000 Diploma Winner
"The Soul of the Dance" in nomination "The Star"
An Honoured Artist of Russian Federation, Distinction for the Achievements in Culture from the Ministry of Culture of  Russian Federation, Distinction for the Achievements in Culture from the Ministry of Culture

Roles
Adam, Giselle – Giselle
Adam, Le Corsaire – Gulnara
Asaf, Flames of Paris – Adeline, Mirelle de Poitiers
Balanchine, Jewels – Emeralds, Rubies and Diamonds (leading part)
Beethoven and Richter, Short Time TogetherChopin, Lady of the Camellias – Marguerite Gautier
Debussy. Afternoon of a Faun – Soloist
Delerue, The Lesson – Pupil
Delibes, Coppélia – Swanilda
Demutsky, A Hero of Our Time - Princess Mary
Demutsky, Nureyev - MargotDesyatnikov, Lost Illusions - Coralie
Gavrilin, Annie – Annie
Glass, In the Upper Room – Soloist
Gottschalk, Tarantella – Soloist
Herold, Vain Precautions – Liza
Khachaturian, Spartacus – Phrygia
Levenshell, La Sylphide – La Sylphide
Melikov, The Legend of Love - Shirin
Mendelssohn-Bartholdy and Ligeti, A Midsummer Night's Dream – Elena
Minkus, Don Quixote – Kitri, Amur
Mozart, Phantasy on the Casanova – Lady
Prokofiev, Romeo and Juliet – Juliet
Prokofiev, Ivan the Terrible - Anastasia
Pugni, Esmeralda – Esmeralda
Pugni, The Pharaoh's Daughter – Ramzea
Rachmaninov, Paganini – Muze
Shostakovich, The Bright Stream – Zina
Shostakovich, The Golden Age – Rita (Margo)
Shostakovich, The Taming of the Shrew - Bianca
Stravinsky, Petrushka – Ballerina
Stravinsky, Agon
Tchaikovsky, Pas de Deux
Tchaikovsky, Les Presages – Frivolity, Passion
Tchaikovsky, Mozartiana – Soloist
Tchaikovsky, Pique Dame – Liza
Tchaikovsky, The Nutcracker – Marie
Tchaikovsky, The Sleeping Beauty – Princess Aurora, Princess Florine
Tchaikovsky, Swan Lake – Odetta/Odilie
Tchaikovsky, Onegin - Tatiana

References

1978 births
Living people
Russian ballerinas
People from Rostov-on-Don
Bolshoi Ballet principal dancers
Honored Artists of the Russian Federation
20th-century Russian ballet dancers
21st-century Russian ballet dancers